Kwasi Donsu (born 2 December 1995), is a Ghanaian professional footballer who plays for Medeama in the Ghana Premier League.

Career
Donsu led the Ghana Premier League in scoring during its abbreviated 2018 season with 8 goals and compiled 22 goals in 39 appearances between 2017 and 2018. With the 2019 season in Ghana unclear Donsu and teammate Ibrahim Yaro were loaned to USL Championship team Colorado Springs Switchbacks with an option to buy. The option for both players was declined and they returned to Ghana after the 2019 USL Championship season ended.

References

External links

USL Bio

1995 births
Living people
Ghanaian footballers
Association football midfielders
Colorado Springs Switchbacks FC players
USL Championship players
People from Tamale, Ghana